Leonid Nikolayevich Agutin (born July 16, 1968) is a Russian pop musician and songwriter, Meritorious Artist of Russia (2008). He has been active since the 1990s. He has released ten albums and three compilation albums.

Personal life
Agutin’s mother is Jewish, father is Russian. He was born in Moscow on July 16, 1968. His father was Nikolai Petrovich Agutin, a musician, and his mother was Lyudmila Leonidovna Shkol'nikova, an elementary school teacher. His father was a singer in the Soviet band VIA "Golubiye Gitary" (Blue Guitars) and worked as a manager for the popular Soviet musical groups "Veseliye Rebyata" (Happy Kids), "Poyuschiye Serdtsa" (Singing Hearts), and "Pesniary" (Songsters).

Along with receiving a regular school education, the young Agutin also completed a course of musical study on the piano at the Moscow Jazz school "Moskvorechie". He later served in the army on the Russia–Finland border.

In 1991, Agutin began to tour former Soviet republics as an opening act for other performers. Two years later, he graduated from the Moscow State Institute of Culture. In 1997, Agutin married the stage performer Anzhelika Varum, his second marriage.

Agutin has two daughters, Elisaveta with Varum, and Polina with the Russian ballerina Maria Vorobyeva. Away from music, he enjoys collecting crosses and playing billiards. He is also a self-avowed believer in the predictions of astrologists.

Career
In 1991, Agutin started touring the Soviet Union with a musical act. He took part in and won the 1992 Yalta international pop music contest, and also won a similar contest in Jūrmala in 1993. Agutin released his first solo album, Bosonogiy Malchik ("Barefoot Boy") in 1994, which was a success and launched his career. The album ascended the charts and he won Russian Grammy awards for "Singer of the Year", "Song of the Year", and "Album of the Year". The album included the hits "Hop hey, la la ley" and "Golos visokiy travy" (Sound of the Tall Grass). In 1995, Agutin released his second album, titled "Dekameron". It was another commercial success and, along with Philipp Kirkorov, Valeriy Meladze, and Lubeh, Agutin became one of the most successful recording artists in Russian Grammy balloting.

Cosmopolitan life

Agutin released the album Cosmopolitan Life with the guitarist Al Di Meola in 2005, which gained success and worldwide recognition as a result of the Montreux Jazz Festival.

Following the festival, the Austrian directors Hannes Rossacher and Rudi Dolezal of DoRo Productions made a documentary about the lives of Agutin and Di Meola, called Cosmopolitan Live, released in February 2008.

Discography

References

External links
Official website

1968 births
Living people
20th-century composers
20th-century Russian singers
21st-century Russian singers
21st-century composers
Honored Artists of the Russian Federation
Russian male composers
Russian pop singers
Singers from Moscow
20th-century Russian male singers
21st-century Russian male singers
Russian National Music Award winners
Winners of the Golden Gramophone Award
Russian activists against the 2022 Russian invasion of Ukraine